Joseph Borguet (born 16 April 1951) is a former Belgian racing cyclist. He rode the 1979 and 1980 Tour de France.

References

External links

1951 births
Living people
Belgian male cyclists
Sportspeople from Liège
Cyclists from Liège Province